Savoir Faire was built to carry freight on the waterways of the Netherlands, Belgium and France but has been converted to act as a hotel barge.

History 
Savoir Faire was built in Amsterdam in 1932. It originally carried cargo in the Netherlands and Belgium.  During World War II, it served as a troop carrier. It was converted to a hotel barge in 1976 and now serves as a hotel barge. The barge cruises in France, the Netherlands, and Belgium, at present most frequently on the Canal de Briare and the Canal latéral à la Loire.

External links
Website of the Savoir Faire

References

Hotel barges
Barges of France
Hotels in France
1932 ships
Hotels established in 1976